James William Ockford (born June 10, 1992) is an American soccer player who plays for Colorado Springs Switchbacks in the USL Championship.

Career

College and amateur
Ockford began his college career at Mount St. Mary's University where he played as a forward for three seasons.  In his freshman year with the Mountaineers, Ockford made 17 appearances and finished the year with one assist.  In 2011, he made 16 appearances and tallied three goals and three assists.  In 2012, he made 17 appearances and tallied two goals.  Following the conclusion of the 2012, Mount St. Mary's Athletics announced that it would cut three of their sports programs, including men's soccer.

On February 6, 2013, it was announced that Ockford transferred to the University of Louisville for his senior season.  In his lone season with the Cardinals, Ockford was converted to defender and he excelled as he made 20 appearances, tallied four goals and helped the Cardinals record nine clean sheets on their way to winning the AAC regular season title.  On November 14, Ockford was named AAC Defender of the Year.

During his time in college, Ockford also played in the USL Premier Development League for Central Jersey Spartans and Reading United.

North American Soccer League
On January 16, 2014, Ockford was drafted in the second round of the 2014 MLS SuperDraft (21st overall) by Seattle Sounders FC.  He signed with the club on February 26 and was immediately loaned to NASL club New York Cosmos.  On May 28, Ockford made his professional debut and scored his first goal in a 2–0 win over NPSL club Brooklyn Italians in the third round of the Lamar Hunt U.S. Open Cup. Three days later, he made his NASL debut and scored in a 3–0 win against Fort Lauderdale Strikers.

Ockford scored two goals and made 10 appearances for the Cosmos during the 2014 regular season, helping the team clinch a berth in The Championship. He also scored one goal in three U.S. Open Cup appearances for the Cosmos.

United Soccer League
On January 10, 2017, it was announced that USL side and San Jose Earthquakes affiliate Reno 1868 FC had signed Ockford. He scored his first goal for the team on May 20, 2017, in Reno's 6–0 rout of his former team Seattle Sounders FC 2. Ockford made his first appearance for San Jose as a 33rd-minute substitute for Andrés Imperiale on July 14, 2017, during San Jose's 4–1 friendly victory over Eintracht Frankfurt.

Ockford joined USL Championship team Louisville City FC on a full-time basis on December 5, 2019.

On December 24, 2020, it was announced that Ockford would join USL Championship side Colorado Springs Switchbacks ahead of their 2021 season.

Major League Soccer
Ockford was signed by the San Jose Earthquakes on December 14, 2017, along with Reno teammates Chris Wehan and Luis Felipe Fernandes. He made his MLS debut on March 3, 2018, during San Jose's season-opening 3–2 victory over Minnesota United, substituting on in the 54th minute after Yeferson Quintana was injured.

Statistics
Statistics accurate as of June 13, 2018.

Honors

University of Louisville
American Athletic Conference regular season champions: 2013

Individual
American Athletic Conference Defender of the Year: 2013

References

External links

Louisville Cardinals bio

1992 births
Living people
American soccer players
Louisville Cardinals men's soccer players
Mount St. Mary's Mountaineers men's soccer players
Central Jersey Spartans players
Reading United A.C. players
Seattle Sounders FC players
New York Cosmos (2010) players
Tacoma Defiance players
Reno 1868 FC players
Nashville SC (2018–19) players
Louisville City FC players
Colorado Springs Switchbacks FC players
Association football defenders
Soccer players from Pennsylvania
Seattle Sounders FC draft picks
USL League Two players
Major League Soccer players
North American Soccer League players
USL Championship players
People from Yardley, Pennsylvania
San Jose Earthquakes players
Sportspeople from Bucks County, Pennsylvania